This is a list of massacres against ethnic Turks.

List

See also
 List of massacres in Cyprus
 List of massacres in Turkey
 List of massacres of Azerbaijanis

References

Bibliography
 

Turkish people
Persecution of Turkish people
Massacres in Turkey
Massacres in Iraq